Alecu Reniță is a Moldovan politician. He is the chairman of the Ecological Movement of Moldova.

Biography 

He served as member of the Parliament of Moldova and is a leader of the Democratic Forum of Romanians in Moldova.

References

External links 
 Cine au fost şi ce fac deputaţii primului Parlament din R. Moldova (1990-1994)?
 Declaraţia deputaţilor din primul Parlament
 Site-ul Parlamentului Republicii Moldova

Living people
Moldovan MPs 1990–1994
20th-century Moldovan politicians
Popular Front of Moldova MPs
Recipients of the Order of Honour (Moldova)
Year of birth missing (living people)